Christine Cusanelli  (born July 15, 1972) is a Canadian former politician who represented the electoral district of Calgary-Currie in the Alberta Legislature. Cusanelli was elected to her first term as MLA for Calgary-Currie on April 23, 2012. Cusanelli was the minister for Tourism, Parks, and Recreation from May 8, 2012, until  February 4, 2013. On May 5, 2015 she was voted out of office in Alberta's general election, losing her seat to Brian Malkinson of Alberta New Democratic Party.

Education and work
Cusanelli has a Bachelor of Education degree from Faculté Saint-Jean at the University of Alberta, and a master's degree in psychology from Gonzaga University in Spokane, Washington. She started her career as a teacher with the Calgary Catholic School District where she taught elementary and junior-high students in French immersion and other educational settings.

In 2012, while in Alison Redford's cabinet, Cusanelli was forced to repay $10,600 in expenses, including $4,078 in airfare incurred after she flew her daughter and mother to the 2012 Summer Olympics in London. In response to media questions, Cusanelli said the expenses were charged as a result of a misunderstanding.

Interests
Her personal interests include running, cycling, swimming and golfing.

She is a member of Chickwagon, a Calgary women's group that raises money and awareness for women in need.

Election results

References

External links 
Website of the Legislative Assembly of Alberta
Progressive Conservative of Alberta Website

1972 births
Living people
Progressive Conservative Association of Alberta MLAs
Women MLAs in Alberta
Politicians from Calgary
Members of the Executive Council of Alberta
University of Alberta alumni
Gonzaga University alumni
21st-century Canadian politicians
21st-century Canadian women politicians
Women government ministers of Canada